The 89th Indian Infantry Brigade was an Infantry formation of the Indian Army during World War II. It was formed in October 1942, at Bhiar Kund in India. The brigade was assigned to the 7th Indian Infantry Division and fought in the Burma Campaign. Apart from between May to June 1944, when it was attached to the 5th Indian Infantry Division, the brigade remained with the 7th Division until the end of the war.

Formation
4th Battalion, 8th Gurkha Rifles October 1942 to August 1945
7th Battalion, 15th Punjab Regiment October 1942 to September 1943 
2nd Battalion, King's Own Scottish Borderers January 1943 to June 1945
7th Battalion, 2nd Punjab Regiment September 1943 to March 1944
4th Battalion, 1st Gurkha Rifles January and February 1944
3rd Battalion, 6th Gurkha Rifles  June to August 1945
1st Battalion, 11th Sikh Regiment April 1944 to August 1945
7th Battalion, York and Lancaster Regiment June to July 1945
4th Battalion, Queen's Own Royal West Kent Regiment July to August 1945

See also

 List of Indian Army Brigades in World War II

References

British Indian Army brigades
Military units and formations in Burma in World War II